WYDS (93.1 FM) is a Top 40/CHR-formatted station licensed in Decatur, Illinois, and is currently known on-air as "93.1 The Party." The station can be heard into Springfield, Illinois. Its main competitor is WSOY-FM, which also has a Top 40/CHR format.

Uniquely, the station has used all three available HD Radio subchannels to air different programming: HD2 as urban adult contemporary, HD3 as classic country, and HD4 as sports talk. The station owners apportioned translators to ensure that to the greatest extent possible, the population targeted and station coverage matched. HD radio supporters argue that this allows the owners to maximize revenue, by allowing all demographics to be targeted, not just those who would be listening to the original signal.

References

External links
WYDS Website

Macon County, Illinois
YDS-FM
Contemporary hit radio stations in the United States
Radio stations established in 1993
1993 establishments in Illinois